Mie kocok (lit: "shaken noodle"), is an Indonesian beef noodle soup, specialty of Bandung city, West Java. The dish consists of noodles served in rich beef consommé soup, kikil (beef tendon or slices of cow's trotters), bean sprouts and bakso (beef meatball), kaffir lime juice, and sprinkled with sliced fresh celery, scallion and fried shallot. Some recipes might add beef tripe.

In Indonesian the term kocok means "shake", and it refers to the method of softening and cooking the noodles by shaking the noodles placed in a handled porous tin container, while being simmered in hot water. The dish uses flat yellow noodles.

To add taste and spiciness kecap manis (sweet soy sauce) and sambal might be added. A similar-named but slightly different chicken-based noodle dish from the neighboring city of Cirebon is called mie koclok.

See also 

 Mie koclok
 Mie celor
 List of soups

References

External links 
 Mie Kocok recipe
 Mie Kocok Bandung recipe 
 Video about mie kocok street vendor

Indonesian noodle dishes
Noodle soups